Alexis Hill may refer to:

Alexis Hill (romance writer), romance pseudonym used by Mary Francis Shura (1923–1991)
Alexis Hill, romance pseudonym used by Ruth Glick and Louise Titchener